Jürgen Stark (born 31 May 1948 in Gau-Odernheim, Germany) is a German economist who served as a member of the Executive Board of the European Central Bank from 2006 to 2011 and concurrently
as ECB chief economist. Within the Executive Board, he was responsible for Economics and for Monetary Analysis and resigned before expiration of his term in opposition to ECB's bond-buying programme.

Early life and education
Stark grew up in Rhineland-Palatinate. His father owned a vineyard in Gau-Odernheim in the Rheinhessen wine region. Stark, the second son, considered continuing in the family business. He studied economics at the University of Hohenheim and University of Tübingen, both near Stuttgart, from 1968 to 1973. During that time, he told an interviewer he participated in protests including against the Vietnam War: “We all, more or less at one point or time or another, had revolutionary ideas about what was just. But this was an episode that came to an end with the end of my studies. Then I became more serious.”

He received a doctorate in 1975.

Career
From 1978 to 1998 Stark held economic policy positions in the German Federal Government.  From September 1998 to May 2006 he served two consecutive terms as Vice President of the Bundesbank, acting as President of the bank in 2004.

On 9 September 2011, it was reported that Stark would leave the ECB due to disagreement with the bank's controversial bond-buying programme, according to Reuters, while the ECB officially announced his resignation as being for "personal reasons". Stark's term had been set to expire in May 2014. Although he has officially resigned, he will continue to discharge the duties of his post until a successor is appointed, before the end of 2011. Current deputy finance minister of Germany, Jörg Asmussen, has been nominated as Stark's successor. In December, Stark spoke out against the idea of the International Monetary Fund becoming a major participant in broader efforts to address the European sovereign debt crisis. He envisioned instead, in an interview with the Sueddeutsche Zeitung, "an informal board of experts, which carefully checks the budgets of member states ... [, as] the nucleus for a future European finance ministry."

Other activities

Corporate boards
 Amundi, Member of the Global Advisory Board (since 2016)

Non-profit organizations
 Bertelsmann Stiftung, Member of the Board of Trustees (since 2012)
 Free Democratic Party (FDP), Member of the Business Forum
 Friedrich August von Hayek Foundation, Member of the Board of Trustees
 Ifo Institute for Economic Research, Deputy Chairman of the Board of Trustees
 Senckenberg Nature Research Society, Member of the Board of Trustees

Personal life	
Stark "and his wife, Christine, whom he married in 1973, have a retirement house on the Baltic sea. They have two children. ... [H]e is on the board of Frankfurt’s Senckenberg natural history museum, reflecting his interest in palaeontology", it was reported in 2009.

References

External links
J. Stark biography at the ECB
The Global Financial Crisis and the Role of Monetary Policy, (speech by J. Stark September 2011)

|-

|-

1948 births
German economists
Living people
Presidents of the Deutsche Bundesbank
University of Tübingen alumni
Executive Board of the European Central Bank members